is a subway station in Nerima, Tokyo, Japan. This station is served by the Toei Ōedo Line. The station number is E-37.

Lines
Toei Ōedo Line

Platforms
The station is composed of one island platform with two tracks.

Sources
This article was originally translated from the article :ja:練馬春日町駅 at the Japanese Wikipedia

Railway stations in Japan opened in 1991
Toei Ōedo Line
Stations of Tokyo Metropolitan Bureau of Transportation
Railway stations in Tokyo